2017 Fagiano Okayama season.

J2 League

References

External links
 J.League official site

Fagiano Okayama
Fagiano Okayama seasons